Mark Bell (22 February 1971 – 8 October 2014) was a British DJ, record producer, and member of the pioneering techno group LFO. He recorded on Warp Records, and also collaborated with artists such as Björk and Depeche Mode.

Biography

Early life
Mark Bell's early musical influences came from three specific sources. One was an art teacher in school who taught art and played music by Jean-Michel Jarre and Kraftwerk, an older sister who played disco, funk music and electro from her bedroom, and a music shop in Leeds Mark described as having "arcade games like Tempest and Defender" and that it would play "loads of early hip hop like Schoolly D. I remember feeling this is mine and my friend’s place". Bell's first experiments in electronic music involved him making a deal with his girlfriend's father who made his musical ballads listened to despite disliking them. Bell convinced him he required a real backing band and purchased his drum machine from him.

Bell went to college to study photography and graphic design, where he met the West Yorkshire DJ Martin Williams and Gez Varley. With money from Varley's grandmother, Bell had access to a bedroom full of equipment. In 1988, Varley, Bell and Martin began to play gigs as LFO, named after the low frequency oscillator, a function of many synthesizers.

LFO
LFO were performing at the Warehouse, a club in Leeds, when Steve Beckett and Rob Mitchell arrived and noticed the positive reception club goers had to the track "LFO". Beckett and Mitchell were the original creators of the Warp record label, but had not officially created the label yet. Despite this, Beckett and Mitchell offered to put out a 12-inch single, which was expected to sell about 2,000 copies but eventually became a Top 20 hit. The label released their first studio album Frequencies in 1991. Following the album's release, Bell continued to release singles for other independent labels such as Carl Craig's Planet E. 

While working on a follow-up album, Bell began his partnership with Björk before the release of her album Post. Bell gave her a cassette of LFO demo material allowing her to use what she wanted for a future release. Björk chose a track that would later become her song "I Go Humble", which would show up again in instrumental form as "Shove Piggy Shove" on the LFO album Advance in 1996. When asked about the long gap between records, Bell stated “It’s not intentional...It's easy doing your first album as you have all the first part of your life to express. The second one is harder unless you're going to repeat yourself... and repetition bores me a bit, it's a complete wasted opportunity to be creative." After the release of Advance, Bell and Varley parted ways, with Bell retaining rights to the name LFO. Bell continued to perform under the LFO moniker.

Bell released one more LFO album, Sheath in 2003.

Production work

Bell worked on almost every Björk album until Biophilia in 2011.

Björk had initially wanted Bell to contribute to her albums Debut and Post, however, he started a real collaboration with her on the album Homogenic. Bell was credited for the majority of the album's production, including the songs "Pluto", "Alarm Call", and the bassline in "Jóga". Björk stated that she "trusts and respects what [Bell] does for me. If I were to say who has influenced me most it would be Stockhausen, Kraftwerk, Brian Eno and Mark Bell".

Bell would also produce Björk's Selmasongs, the soundtrack to the Lars von Trier's film Dancer in the Dark.

Bell also produced Depeche Mode's Exciter. Bell commented that he found working with the group fun but strange, stating he had listened to the group when he was 12 and found the band asking him for days off or for "what they should eat".

Other collaborations
Other collaborations included contributing to Deltron 3030's self-titled album.

Death
Bell died on 8 October 2014 at the age of 43. His death was reported on 13 October 2014 due to complications after surgery.

Discography

as Speed Jack

Albums
Surge (R&S, 1996)
Sheath (Warp, 2003)

Singles
 1994 "Storm"
 1994 "C.T.C."
 1996 "Blue Bossa"

as Clark
 1995 "Lofthouse"

as Fawn
 1995 Klip EP

as Counterpoint
 1996 "Jigsaw"

Production
 1997 Björk - Homogenic
 2000 Björk - Selmasongs
 2001 Depeche Mode - Exciter
 2004 Björk - Medúlla
 2005 Björk - Drawing Restraint 9
 2007 Björk - Volta
 2011 Björk - Biophilia

References

General references

External links
 

1971 births
2014 deaths
21st-century British musicians
British record producers
British techno musicians
English male musicians
Musicians from Leeds
People from Wakefield
Place of birth missing
Place of death missing
20th-century English musicians
20th-century British male musicians
20th-century British musicians
21st-century British male musicians